Thomaz Koch and Fiorella Bonicelli were the defending champions but only Fiorella Bonicelli competed that year with Jairo Velasco. Jairo Velasco and Fiorella Bonicelli lost in the quarterfinals to Kim Warwick and Ilana Kloss.

Kim Warwick and Ilana Kloss won in the final 5–7, 7–6, 6–2 against Colin Dowdeswell and Linky Boshoff
.

Draw

Finals

Top half

Bottom half

References

External links
1976 French Open – Doubles draws and results at the International Tennis Federation

Mixed Doubles
French Open by year – Mixed doubles